John Richard Hedges Becher (13 March 1861 – 11 May 1946) was an Anglican Archdeacon in Ireland in the first half of the twentieth century.

Becher was educated at Trinity College, Dublin and ordained in 1886. He began his career with curacies in Dunmore East and Kersal. He held Incumbencies in Kilrush and  Lorum. He was Archdeacon of Leighlin from 1922 to 1924; and the Archdeacon of Ossory and Leighlin from 1924 to 1940.

References

Alumni of Trinity College Dublin
Archdeacons of Ossory and Leighlin
Archdeacons of Leighlin
20th-century Irish Anglican priests
1861 births
1946 deaths